Parachute is a European type foundry with offices in Athens and London. It was founded in 2001 by Panos Vassiliou.  It designs fonts for sale and for private customers such as Bank of America, European Commission, UEFA, Samsung, IKEA, Interbrand, National Geographic, Financial Times, National Bank of Greece, Alpha Bank  and many others.

Many of its fonts were developed to support Latin, Cyrillic and Greek. The list included several award-winning typefaces such as PF Centro Pro, PF Champion Script Pro and PF Goudy Initials Pro. These typefaces were released for the first time online in 2007.

In 2008, Parachute won a major Gold award at the European Design Awards 2008 for the PF Centro type families which were designed by Panos Vassiliou. Ever since Parachute has won more than 25 awards and distinctions including the prestigious Red Dot: Grand Prix 2012.

In 2010, Parachute released the first ever Arabic version of DIN. PF DIN Text Arabic was designed as a collaboration between Panos Vassiliou and Arab designer Hasan Abu Afash.

Typefaces
PF Bague
PF Regal
PF Centro
PF DIN Text
PF DIN Display
PF Champion Script
PF Beau Sans
PF Square Sans
PF Adamant
PF Encore Sans
PF Das Grotesk
PF Handbook
PF Fuel
PF Occula
PF Benchmark
PF Monumenta

Major Awards

Publications 
YearBook of Type 2 - Germany - Niggli Verlag | 2016

BranD magazine - China - October 2015 | Micro-forum

Slanted 24 / Istanbul Issue - Germany - October 2014 | Square Sans

Size-specific adjustments to type designs - Germany - Just Another Foundry | 2014

New Graphic - China - Nanjing University of the Arts | 2014

BranD magazine - China - November 2013 | Interview

YearBook of Type - Germany - Niggli Verlag | 2013

Slanted magazine / Babylon Issue - Germany - August 2013 | Regal

The Briem Report: Letterforms 2012 - United States - Operina | 2013

Understanding Type - United Kingdom - AVA Publishing | 2013

Slanted magazine - Germany - September 2012 | Interview

Page magazine - Germany - November 2011 | Schatten und Licht

Type Navigator - Germany - Gestalten | 2011

Arabesque 2 - Germany - Gestalten | 2011

Page magazine - Germany - July 2011 | Typo-Objekte

Computer Arts - United Kingdom - June 2011 | 150 fonts you can’t live without

Quotation magazine - Japan - Spring 2011 | London, Tokyo, New York City, Berlin and more

KAK magazine - Russia - Fall 2010 | European Design

.Net magazine - United Kingdom - November 2010 | Top 20 Fonts for Web Design

Page magazine - Germany - November 2010 | DIN Text Arabic

Brush ’n’ Script - Germany - Verlag Hermann Schmidt Mainz | 2010

Publish - Netherlands - Fall 2010 | Encore en Centro

Typolyrics - Germany - Birkhäuser GmbH, Basel | 2010

Computer Arts - United Kingdom - October 2009 | 114 pro Tips for Type

1000 Ideas by 100 Designers - Spain - Rockport Publishers | 2009

Publish - Netherlands - Fall 2009 | DIN, FF, PF en Next

Smashing magazine - Online - April 2009 | 30 Brilliant Typefaces for Corporate Design

Smashing magazine - Online - March 2009 | Fantastic Typography Blogs for your Inspiration

Novum - Germany - February 2009 | Parachute: Precision Landing

Font magazine - Czech Republic - January 2009 | Interview

Graphic Design Inspirations - Germany - Daab Publishing | 2008

Visual Evasion - Online - December 2008 | 10 Best Typeface Designs of 2008

Slanted - Germany - December 2008 | Fontnames Illustrated

Typo -  Czech Republic - Summer 2008 | Byzantine Ornaments

Ministry of Type - Online - March 2008 | Champion Script Pro

Slanted - Germany - September 2007 | Fontlabels, Fonts & Families

References

Companies based in Athens
Type foundries
Greek companies established in 2001
Manufacturing companies established in 2001